The Kalam cosmological argument is a modern formulation of the cosmological argument for the existence of God. It is named after the Kalam (medieval Islamic scholasticism) from which its key ideas originated. William Lane Craig was principally responsible for giving new life to the argument, due to his The Kalām Cosmological Argument (1979), among other writings.

The argument's key underpinning idea is the metaphysical impossibility of actual infinities and of a temporally past-infinite universe, traced by Craig to 11th-century Persian Muslim scholastic philosopher Al-Ghazali. This feature distinguishes it from other cosmological arguments, such as that of Thomas Aquinas, which rests on the impossibility of a causally ordered infinite regress, and those of Leibniz and Samuel Clarke, which refer to the Principle of Sufficient Reason.

Since Craig's original publication, the  Kalam cosmological argument has elicited public debate between Craig and Graham Oppy, Adolf Grünbaum, J. L. Mackie and Quentin Smith, and has been used in Christian apologetics. According to Michael Martin, the cosmological arguments presented by Craig, Bruce Reichenbach, and Richard Swinburne are "among the most sophisticated and well argued in contemporary theological philosophy".

Form of the argument

The most prominent form of the argument, as defended by William Lane Craig, states the Kalam cosmological argument as the following syllogism:
Everything that begins to exist has a cause.
The universe began to exist.
Therefore, the universe has a cause.

Given the conclusion, Craig appends a further premise and conclusion based upon a philosophical analysis of the properties of the cause of the universe:
 

 If the universe has a cause, then an uncaused, personal Creator of the universe exists who sans (without) the universe is beginningless, changeless, immaterial, timeless, spaceless and enormously powerful.

 Therefore, an uncaused, personal Creator of the universe exists, who sans the universe is beginningless, changeless, immaterial, timeless, spaceless and enormously powerful.

Referring to the implications of Classical Theism that follow from this argument, Craig writes:

"... transcending the entire universe there exists a cause which brought the universe into being ex nihilo ... our whole universe was caused to exist by something beyond it and greater than it. For it is no secret that one of the most important conceptions of what theists mean by 'God' is Creator of heaven and earth."

Historical background

The Kalam cosmological argument is based on the concept of the prime-mover, introduced by Aristotle, and entered early Christian or Neoplatonist philosophy  in Late Antiquity, being developed by John Philoponus. Along with much of classical Greek philosophy, the concept was adopted into medieval Islamic tradition during the Islamic Golden Age, where it received its fullest articulation at the hands of Muslim scholars, most directly by Islamic theologians of the Sunni tradition.

Its historic proponents include Al-Kindi, Al-Ghazali, and St. Bonaventure.

One of the earliest formulations of the Kalam cosmological argument in the Islamic philosophical tradition comes from Al-Ghazali, who writes:

"Every being which begins has a cause for its beginning; now the world is a being which begins; therefore, it possesses a cause for its beginning."

Between the 9th to 12th centuries, the cosmological argument developed as a concept within Islamic theology. It was refined in the 11th century by Al-Ghazali (The Incoherence of the Philosophers), and in the 12th by Ibn Rushd (Averroes). It reached medieval Christian philosophy in the 13th century and was discussed by Bonaventure, as well as Thomas Aquinas in his Summa Theologica (I, q.2, a.3) and Summa Contra Gentiles (I, 13).

Islamic perspectives may be divided into positive Aristotelian responses strongly supporting the argument, such as those by Al-Kindi, and Averroes, and negative responses critical of it, including those by Al-Ghazali and Muhammad Iqbal. Al-Ghazali was unconvinced by the first-cause arguments of Al-Kindi, arguing that only the infinite per se (that is an essentially ordered infinite series) is impossible, arguing for the possibility of the infinite per accidens (that is an accidentally ordered infinite series). He writes:

"According to the hypothesis under consideration, it has been established that all the beings in the world have a cause. Now, let the cause itself have a cause, and the cause of the cause have yet another cause, and so on ad infinitum. It does not behove you to say that an infinite regress of causes is impossible."

Muhammad Iqbal also stated:

"To finish the series at a certain point, and to elevate one member of the series to the dignity of an uncaused first cause, is to set at naught the very law of causation on which the whole argument proceeds."

Contemporary discourse

According to the atheist philosopher Quentin Smith, "a count of the articles in the philosophy journals shows that more articles have been published about Craig's defense of the Kalam argument than have been published about any other philosopher's contemporary formulation of an argument for God's existence."

The Kalam cosmological argument has received criticism from philosophers such as J. L. Mackie, Graham Oppy, Michael Martin, Quentin Smith, physicists Paul Davies, Lawrence Krauss and Victor Stenger, and authors such as Dan Barker.

Modern discourse encompasses the fields of both philosophy and science (e.g. the fields of quantum physics and cosmology), which Bruce Reichenbach summarises as:
"... whether there needs to be a cause of the first natural existent, whether something like the universe can be finite and yet not have a beginning, and the nature of infinities and their connection with reality".

Since the temporal ordering of events is central, the Kalam argument also brings issues of the nature of time into the discussion.

Premise one: "Whatever begins to exist has a cause."

Craig and Sinclair have stated that the first premise is obviously true, at least more plausibly true than its negation. Craig offers three reasons why the first premise is true:

Rational intuition: Craig states that the first premise is self-evidently true, being based upon the  metaphysical intuition that "something cannot come into being from nothing", or "Ex nihilo nihil fit", originating from Parmenidean philosophy. He states that for something to come into being without any cause is to come into being from nothing, which he says is "surely absurd."
Reductio ad absurdum: if false, it would be inexplicable why just anything and everything does not randomly come into existence without a cause.
Inductive reasoning from both common experience and scientific evidence, which constantly verifies and never falsifies the truth of the first premise.

According to Reichenbach, "the Causal Principle has been the subject of extended criticism", which can be divided into philosophical and scientific criticisms.

Philosophical objections
Graham Oppy, J. L. Mackie and Wes Morriston have objected to the intuitiveness of the first premise. Oppy states:

"Mackie, [Adolf] Grunbaum, [Quentin] Smith and I—among many others—have taken issue with the first premise: why should it be supposed that absolutely everything which begins to exist has a cause for its beginning to exist?"

Mackie affirms that there is no good reason to assume a priori that an uncaused beginning of all things is impossible. Moreover, that the Causal Principle cannot be extrapolated to the universe from inductive experience. He appeals to David Hume's thesis (An Enquiry Concerning Human Understanding) that effects without causes can be conceived in the mind, and that what is conceivable in the mind is possible in the real world. This argument has been criticised by Bruce Reichenbach and G.E.M. Anscombe, who point out the phenomenological and logical problems in inferring factual possibility from conceivability. Craig notes:

"Hume himself clearly believed in the causal principle. He presupposes throughout the Enquiry that events have causes, and in 1754 he wrote to John Stewart, 'But allow me to tell you that I never asserted so absurd a Proposition as that anything might arise without a cause'".

Morriston asserts that causal laws are physical processes for which we have intuitive knowledge in the context of events within time and space, but that such intuitions do not hold true for the beginning of time itself. He states:

"We have no experience of the origin of worlds to tell us that worlds don't come into existence like that. We don't even have experience of the coming into being of anything remotely analogous to the “initial singularity” that figures in the Big Bang theory of the origin of the universe."

In reply, Craig has maintained that causal laws are unrestricted metaphysical truths that are "not contingent upon the properties, causal powers, and dispositions of the natural kinds of substances which happen to exist", remarking:

"The history of twentieth century astrophysical cosmology belies Morriston's claim that people have no strong intuitions about the need of a causal explanation of the origin of time and the universe."

Quantum physics

A common objection to premise one appeals to the phenomenon of quantum indeterminacy, where, at the subatomic level, the causal principle; "everything that begins to exist has a cause" appears to break down. Craig replies that the phenomenon of indeterminism is specific to the Copenhagen Interpretation of Quantum Mechanics, pointing out that this is only one of a number of different interpretations, some of which he states are fully deterministic (mentioning David Bohm) and none of which are as yet known to be true. He concludes that subatomic physics is not a proven exception to the first premise.

The philosopher Quentin Smith has cited the example of virtual particles, which appear and disappear from observation, apparently at random, to assert the tenability of uncaused natural phenomena. In his book A Universe from Nothing: Why There is Something Rather Than Nothing, cosmologist Lawrence Krauss has proposed how quantum mechanics can explain how space-time and matter can emerge from 'nothing' (referring to the quantum vacuum). Philosopher Michael Martin has also referred to quantum vacuum fluctuation models to support the idea of a universe with uncaused beginnings. He writes:

"Even if the universe has a beginning in time, in the light of recently proposed cosmological theories this beginning may be uncaused. Despite Craig's claim that theories postulating that the universe 'could pop into existence uncaused' are incapable of 'sincere affirmation,' such similar theories are in fact being taken seriously by scientists."

Philosopher of science David Albert has criticised the use of the term 'nothing' in describing the quantum vacuum. In a review of Krauss's book, he states:

"Relativistic-quantum-field-theoretical vacuum states—no less than giraffes or refrigerators or solar systems—are particular arrangements of elementary physical stuff. The true relativistic-quantum-field-theoretical equivalent to there not being any physical stuff at all isn't this or that particular arrangement of the fields—what it is (obviously, and ineluctably, and on the contrary) is the simple absence of the fields."

Likewise, Craig has argued that the quantum vacuum, in containing quantifiable, measurable energy, cannot be described as 'nothing', therefore, that phenomena originating from the quantum vacuum cannot be described as 'uncaused'. On the topic of virtual particles, he writes:

"For virtual particles do not literally come into existence spontaneously out of nothing. Rather the energy locked up in a vacuum fluctuates spontaneously in such a way as to convert into evanescent particles that return almost immediately to the vacuum."

Cosmologist Alexander Vilenkin has stated that even "the absence of space, time and matter" cannot truly be defined as 'nothing' given that the laws of physics are still present, though it would be "as close to nothing as you can get".

Premise two: "The universe began to exist."

Craig defends premise two using both physical arguments with evidence from cosmology and physics, and metaphysical arguments for the impossibility of actual infinities in reality.

Cosmology and physics

For physical evidence, Craig appeals to:

Scientific confirmation against a past-infinite universe in the form of the Second Law of Thermodynamics.
Scientific evidence that the universe began to exist a finite time ago at the Big Bang.
The Borde–Guth–Vilenkin theorem, a cosmological theorem which deduces that any universe that has, on average, been expanding throughout its history cannot be infinite in the past but must have a past space-time boundary.

Professor Alexander Vilenkin, one of the three authors of the Borde–Guth–Vilenkin theorem, writes:

"A remarkable thing about this theorem is its sweeping generality. We made no assumptions about the material content of the universe. We did not even assume that gravity is described by Einstein's equations. So, if Einstein's gravity requires some modification, our conclusion will still hold. The only assumption that we made was that the expansion rate of the universe never gets below some nonzero value, no matter how small."

Victor J. Stenger has referred to the Aguirre–Gratton model for eternal inflation as an exemplar by which others disagree with the Borde–Guth–Vilenkin theorem. In private correspondence with Stenger, Vilenkin remarked how the Aguirre–Gratton model attempts to evade a beginning by reversing the "arrow of time" at t = 0, but that: "This makes the moment t = 0 rather special. I would say no less special than a true beginning of the universe."

At the "State of the Universe" conference at Cambridge University in January 2012, Vilenkin discussed problems with various theories that would claim to avoid the need for a cosmological beginning, alleging the untenability of eternal inflation, cyclic and cosmic egg models, eventually concluding: "All the evidence we have says that the universe had a beginning."

Actual infinities

On the metaphysical impossibility of actual infinities, Craig asserts:
The metaphysical impossibility of an actually infinite series of past events by citing David Hilbert's famous Hilbert's Hotel thought experiment.
The impossibility of forming an actual infinite by successive addition, referencing Bertrand Russell's example of Tristram Shandy.

Michael Martin disagrees with these assertions by Craig, saying:

"Craig's a priori arguments are unsound or show at most that actual infinities have odd properties. This latter fact is well known, however, and shows nothing about whether it is logically impossible to have actual infinities in the real world."

Andrew Loke has argued against the metaphysical possibility of a beginningless universe as well as that of an actual infinite existing in the real world.

Another criticism comes from Thomist philosopher Dr. Edward Feser who claims that past and future events are potential rather than actual, meaning that an infinite past could exist in a similar way to how an infinite number of potential halfway points exist between any two given points.

Conclusion: "The universe has a cause."

Given that the Kalam cosmological argument is a deductive argument, if both premises are true, the truth of the conclusion follows necessarily.

In a critique of Craig's book The Kalam Cosmological Argument, published in 1979, Michael Martin states:
"It should be obvious that Craig's conclusion that a single personal agent created the universe is a non sequitur. At most, this Kalam argument shows that some personal agent or agents created the universe. Craig cannot validly conclude that a single agent is the creator. On the contrary, for all he shows, there may have been trillions of personal agents involved in the creation."
Martin also claims that Craig has not justified his claim of creation "ex nihilo", pointing out that the universe may have been created from pre-existing material in a timeless or eternal state. Moreover, that Craig takes his argument too far beyond what his premises allow in deducing that the creating agent is greater than the universe. For this, he cites the example of a parent "creating" a child who eventually becomes greater than he or she.

In the subsequent Blackwell Companion to Natural Theology, published in 2009, Craig discusses the properties of the cause of the universe, arguing that they follow as consequences of a conceptual analysis and of the cause of the universe and by entailment from the initial syllogism of the argument:

A first state of the material world cannot have a material explanation and must originate ex nihilo in being without material cause, because no natural explanation can be causally prior to the very existence of the natural world (space-time and its contents). It follows necessarily that the cause is outside of space and time (timeless, spaceless), immaterial, and enormously powerful, in bringing the entirety of material reality into existence.
Even if positing a plurality of causes prior to the origin of the universe, the causal chain must terminate in a cause which is absolutely first and uncaused, otherwise an infinite regress of causes would arise, which Craig and Sinclair argue is impossible.
Occam's Razor maintains that the absolute unity of the First Cause should be assumed unless there are specific reasons to believe that there is more than one causeless cause. 
Agent causation, volitional action, is the only ontological condition in which an effect can arise in the absence of prior determining conditions. Therefore, only personal, free agency can account for the origin of a first temporal effect from a changeless cause. 
Abstract objects, the only other ontological category known to have the properties of being uncaused, spaceless, timeless and immaterial, do not sit in volitional causal relationships.

Craig concludes that the cause of the existence of the universe is an "uncaused, personal Creator ... who sans the universe is beginningless, changeless, immaterial, timeless, spaceless and enormously powerful"; remarking upon the theological implications of this union of properties.

Theories of time

Craig holds to the A-theory of time, also known as the "tensed theory of time" or presentism, as opposed to its alternative, the B-theory of time, also known as the "tenseless theory of time" or eternalism. The latter would allow the universe to exist tenselessly as a four-dimensional space-time block, under which circumstances the universe would not "begin to exist": The form of the Kalam he presents in his earlier work rests on this theory:

"From start to finish, the Kalam cosmological argument is predicated upon the A-Theory of time. On a B-Theory of time, the universe does not in fact come into being or become actual at the Big Bang; it just exists tenselessly as a four-dimensional space-time block that is finitely extended in the earlier than direction. If time is tenseless, then the universe never really comes into being, and, therefore, the quest for a cause of its coming into being is misconceived."

Craig has defended the A-theory against objections from J. M. E. McTaggart and hybrid A–B theorists. Philosopher Yuri Balashov has criticised Craig's attempt to reconcile the A-theory with special relativity by relying on a ‘neo‐Lorentzian interpretation' of Special Relativity. Balashov claims:

"Despite the fact that presentism has the firm backing of common sense and eternalism revolts against it, eternalism is widely regarded as almost the default view in contemporary debates, and presentism as a highly problematic view."

Craig has criticised Balashov for adopting a verificationist methodology that fails to address the metaphysical and theological foundations of the A-theory.

It has recently been argued that a defense of the Kalam cosmological argument does not have to involve such a commitment to the A-theory. Craig has since modified his view of the A-theory being necessary for the Kalam, stating that while the Kalam would need to be reformulated, "it wouldn't be fatal" on a B-theory.

See also

Arguments for the existence of God
Cosmogony
Natural theology
Principle of sufficient reason
Temporal finitism
Agent causation
Kalam

References

Sources

Further reading

 
 
 
 
 
 

Arguments for the existence of God
Kalam
Philosophy of religion